Soul Liberation is an album by jazz saxophonist Rusty Bryant recorded for the Prestige label in 1970.

Reception

The Allmusic site awarded the album 4½ stars stating "This has a bluesier, harder R&B feel than his previous effort (Night Train Now), courtesy of a revamped lineup".

Track listing
All compositions by Rusty Bryant except where noted
 "Cold Duck Time" (Eddie Harris) - 6:19  
 "The Ballad of Oren Bliss" - 5:59  
 "Lou-Lou" (Charles Earland) - 8:12  
 "Soul Liberation" (Earland) - 11:35  
 "Freeze-Dried Soul" - 7:30

Personnel
Rusty Bryant - alto saxophone, tenor saxophone
Virgil Jones - trumpet
Charles Earland - organ
Melvin Sparks - guitar
Idris Muhammad - drums

Production
 Bob Porter - producer
 Rudy Van Gelder - engineer

References

Rusty Bryant albums
1970 albums
Prestige Records albums
Albums produced by Bob Porter (record producer)
Albums recorded at Van Gelder Studio